Personal Egress Air Packs, or PEAPs, were devices on board a Space Shuttle that provided crew members with about six minutes of breathable air in the case of a mishap while the vehicle was still on the ground. PEAPs did not provide pressurized air, meaning they were only intended to be used if the air inside the shuttle cabin become unbreathable because of noxious gases.

The devices gained public attention after the Challenger disaster. After the recovery of the vehicle cockpit, it was found that three of the crew PEAPs were activated: those of mission specialist Ellison Onizuka, mission specialist Judith Resnik, and pilot Michael J. Smith.  The location of Smith's activation switch, on the back side of his seat, means that either Resnik or Onizuka likely activated it for him.   Mike Mullane writes: 

This showed that at least two of the crew members (Onizuka and Resnik) were alive after the cockpit separated from the vehicle. However, if the cabin had lost pressure, the packs alone would not have sustained the crew during the two-minute descent.

The partial-pressure launch-entry suits replaced the PEAPs, which were subsequently followed by the "ACES" full-pressure suits, which include self-contained oxygen tanks.

References

Space Shuttle program
Safety equipment